Ahmed Y. Awad Mohammad (born 1 June 1992) is a Palestinian professional footballer who plays as a midfielder for Swedish club Dalkurd and the Palestine national team. 

Awad started playing football in the youth academy of IK Brage, before moving to Dalkurd. In 2013, he transferred to IFK Värnamo in Superettan, but returned to Dalkurd a year later.
He is killed by illegal Israel force.

International career
Awad was raised in Sweden to parents of Palestinian descent, and is eligible for both Sweden and Palestine. In March 2016, Awad accepted a call-up to the Palestine national football team, and was on the bench in their 2–0 loss against the UAE in a FIFA World Cup qualifier on 24 March 2016.

Career statistics

International
Scores and results list Palestine's goal tally first.

Honours

Individual
Svenska Cupen Top goalscorer: 2019–20

References

External links

 
 
 
 

1992 births
Living people
Footballers from Tiberias
Palestinian footballers
Swedish people of Palestinian descent
Association football midfielders
IK Brage players
IFK Värnamo players
Dalkurd FF players
Västerås SK Fotboll players
Superettan players
Ettan Fotboll players
Palestine international footballers